Mackenzie County is a specialized municipality in northern Alberta, Canada. It is located in Census Division 17, along the Mackenzie Highway. The municipal office is located in the hamlet of Fort Vermilion.

History 
Originally Improvement District No. 23, the Municipal District of Mackenzie No. 23 incorporated as a municipal district on January 1, 1995. It subsequently changed its status to specialized municipality on June 23, 1999 "to address concerns about municipal government and management in a municipality that serves a number of unique communities within a very large territory." The Municipal District of Mackenzie No. 23 changed its name to Mackenzie County on March 8, 2007.

Geography 

Mackenzie County is in the northwest corner of the province of Alberta. It borders the province of British Columbia to the west; the Northwest Territories to the north; Improvement District No. 24 (Wood Buffalo National Park) and the Regional Municipality of Wood Buffalo to the east; and Northern Sunrise County, the Paddle Prairie Metis Settlement, and the County of Northern Lights to the south. The Peace River meanders eastward through the southeast portion of Mackenzie County. Some of its water bodies include Bistcho Lake, Eva Lake, Margaret Lake, Wadlin Lake, Wentzel Lake, and Zama Lake. Land formations include Bootis Hill in the northwest, the Caribou Mountains in the northeast, Buffalo Head Hills in the south, Cameron Hills in the north, and Mount Watt northwest of the Town of High Level.

Communities and localities 

The following urban municipalities are surrounded by Mackenzie County.
Cities
none
Towns
High Level
Rainbow Lake
Villages
none
Summer villages
none

The following hamlets are within Mackenzie County.
Hamlets
Fort Vermilion
La Crete
Zama City

The following localities are within Mackenzie County.
Localities

Adams Landing
Assumption
Blumenort
Boyer
Boyer River Settlement
Boyer Settlement
Buffalo Head Prairie
Carcajou Settlement
Chateh
Footner Lake
Fort Vermilion Settlement
Habay

Hutch Lake
Indian Cabins
Little Red River
Lutose
Meander River
Meander River Station
Metis
North Vermilion
North Vermilion Settlement
Slavey Creek
Steen River
Vermilion Chutes

The following settlements are within Mackenzie County.
Settlements

Boyer
Footner
Fort Vermilion
North Vermilion

North Zama
Steen River
Tugate

First Nations have the following Indian reserves within Mackenzie County.
Indian reserves

Amber River 211
Beaver Ranch 163
Beaver Ranch 163A
Beaver Ranch 163B
Bistcho Lake 213
Boyer 164
Bushe River 207
Child Lake 164A
Fort Vermilion 173B

Fox Lake 162
Hay Lake 209
Jackfish Point 214
John D'or Prairie 215
Tallcree 173
Tallcree 173A
Upper Hay River 212
Wadlin Lake 173C
Zama Lake 210

Demographics 

Attractions 
Mackenzie County is home to Caribou Mountains Wildland Provincial Park and Hay-Zama Lakes Wildland Provincial Park. It is also adjacent to Wood Buffalo National Park to the east.

See also 
List of communities in Alberta
Specialized municipalities of Alberta

References

External links 

 
1995 establishments in Alberta
Specialized municipalities in Alberta
Populated places established in 1995